Johannes (Johan) Strömberg (28 August 1868, in Lapinjärvi – 11 March 1952) was a Finnish farmer and politician. He was a member of the Parliament of Finland from 1909 to 1910 and again from 1911 to 1916, representing the Swedish People's Party of Finland (SFP).

References

1868 births
1952 deaths
People from Lapinjärvi
People from Uusimaa Province (Grand Duchy of Finland)
Swedish-speaking Finns
Swedish People's Party of Finland politicians
Members of the Parliament of Finland (1909–10)
Members of the Parliament of Finland (1911–13)
Members of the Parliament of Finland (1913–16)